Eng. Mohammad Asim Asim is a politician in Afghanistan. He is a former governor of Parwan Province from 8 June 2015 till 4 February 2018.

Early life and education 
Asim was born 1958 in Khinjan District, Baghlan Province. He completed his higher education in BA and master in Islamic relations at Peshawar University.

Career 
He served as a Deputy Minister of Telecommunication. Asim was an MP who is close to both Abdullah Abdullah and Yunus Qanuni. He participated in the Emergency Loya Jirga in 2002 and was a member of parliament from 2005 to 2010. During the 2014 presidential campaign, he worked with Dr Abdullah Abdullah and is described as a close aid. He was a key member of his unity government negotiations team.
Mr Asim is married and has five daughters and six sons.

References 

Living people
1958 births
Afghan politicians
Governors of Parwan Province
People from Baghlan Province